Wellington Jeffers (22 June 1814 – 10 February 1896) was a Canadian  teacher, Methodist minister, and editor.
 He served as editor of Toronto's Christian Guardian between 1860 and 1869. In 1863 he was granted an honorary Doctorate of Divinity from Victoria College.

References

1814 births
1896 deaths
Canadian Christian religious leaders
Canadian educators
Canadian newspaper editors
19th-century Canadian journalists
Canadian male journalists
19th-century Canadian male writers